The Wonderful Wizard of Oz or The Wizard of Oz most commonly refers to:

The Wonderful Wizard of Oz, a 1900 American novel by L. Frank Baum often reprinted as The Wizard of Oz
Wizard of Oz (character), from the Baum novel series

These terms may also refer to:

Adaptations of the novel

Film
 The Wonderful Wizard of Oz (1910 film), an American silent film made by the Selig Polyscope Company
 The Wizard of Oz (1925 film), an American silent film directed by Larry Semon
 The Wizard of Oz (1933 film), a Canadian animated short directed by Ted Eshbaugh
 The Wizard of Oz (1939 film), an American MGM film starring Judy Garland
 The Wonderful Wizard of Oz (1975 film), a collection of filmstrips narrated on records edited into a film
 The Wizard of Oz (1982 film), an anime feature film from Japan

Television and video
 The Wizard of Oz (1950 film), a 1950 half-hour television adaptation
 The Wonderful Wizard of Oz (TV series), a 1986–1987 Japanese anime adaptation of four of Baum's books
 The Wizard of Oz (TV series), a 1990 American animated series

Musicals and concerts
 The Wizard of Oz (1902 musical), by L. Frank Baum, Paul Tietjens and others
 The Wizard of Oz (1942 musical), commissioned by the St. Louis Municipal Opera
 The Wizard of Oz (1987 musical), adapted by the Royal Shakespeare Company
 The Wonderful Wizard of Oz (musical), a 2000 musical play based on the novel
 The Wizard of Oz (2004 musical), directed by David Fleeshman
 The Wonderful Wizard of Oz (2005 graphic novel), written by David Chauvel with art by Enrique Fernandez
 The Wonderful Wizard of Oz (2009 comics), an eight-issue limited series by Marvel Comics
 The Wizard of Oz (2011 musical), by Andrew Lloyd Webber and Tim Rice

Gaming
 The Wizard of Oz (1985 video game), an illustrated text adventure game
 The Wizard of Oz (1993 video game), a 1993 SNES game
 The Wizard of Oz: Beyond the Yellow Brick Road, a 2008 Nintendo DS game
 The Wizard of Oz (arcade game), a game that awards tokens redeemable for prizes
 The Wizard of Oz, a slot machine from WMS Gaming
 The Wizard of Oz (pinball), a pinball machine from Jersey Jack gaming

People nicknamed "Wizard of Oz"
 Ozzie Smith (born 1954), American baseball player
 Quinten Hann (born 1977), Australian snooker player
 Simon Whitlock (born 1969), Australian darts player
 The reigning champion of the Oz Academy Openweight Championship

Other uses
 Wizard of Oz experiment, a type of research experiment
 The Wizard of Oz (album), a cast recording of the 2001 Australian production of the stage musical The Wizard of Oz
 Wizards of Oz, Australian jazz ensemble with Dale Barlow, Paul Grabowski, Lloyd Swanton, Tony Buck

See also
 Adaptations of The Wizard of Oz
 List of Oz books
 Meco Plays The Wizard of Oz, a 1978 album by Meco
 Wizard of Ahhhs, a 2007 album by Black Kids